Pikeville is an unincorporated community in Darke County, in the U.S. state of Ohio.

History
Pikeville was platted in 1866. A post office called Pikeville was established in 1862, and remained in operation until 1917. Besides the post office, Pikeville contained a church, school, railroad station, and a country store.

References

Unincorporated communities in Darke County, Ohio
Unincorporated communities in Ohio